Asadabad (also Romanized as Āsadābād; also known as Asadābād-e Soflá) is a village in Firuzabad Rural District, Firuzabad District, Selseleh County, Lorestan Province, Iran. At the 2006 census, its population was 84, in 15 families.

References 

Towns and villages in Selseleh County